The Dragoneer Investment Group (Dragoneer) is an American investment firm based in San Francisco, California. The firm focuses on technology investments in both public and private markets globally.

Background 

Dragoneer is based in San Francisco and was founded in 2012 by Marc Stad. Stad was an investment professional who had previously worked at the Investment Group of Santa Barbara, TPG Capital and McKinsey & Company.

Dragoneer describes itself as growth-oriented investment firm with more than $17 billion in long-duration capital from institutional funds such as endowments, foundations, sovereign wealth funds and family offices.

For public markets, Dragoneer manages long-only strategy funds that invests in technology companies. 

For private markets, Dragoneer manages private growth equity funds that provides funding to private technology companies.  The firm avoids going through the traditional fundraising method and instead tries other methods such as secondary stock sales or using convertible debt notes.

SPAC deals 

In August 2020, Dragoneer Growth Opportunities Corp was listed on the New York Stock Exchange (Ticker: DGNR) raising $600 million. DGNR is a SPAC which is a blank-check company. On 3 February 2021, it was announced that Auto-insurance IT provider, CCC Information Services would become a listed company by merging with DGNR in a deal worth $7 billion.

In November 2020, a second SPAC, Dragoneer Growth Opportunities Corp II was listed on the Nasdaq (Ticker: DGNS) raising $240 million. On July 2021, Cvent became a listed company by merging with DGNS in a deal worth $5.3 billion.

In March 2021, a third SPAC, Dragoneer Growth Opportunities Corp III was listed on the Nasdaq (Ticker: DGNU) raising $400 million.

Funds

Notable venture capital investments 

 Airbnb
 Alibaba Group
 Appfolio
 Atlassian
 Chime
 Compass, Inc.
 CRED
 Databricks
 Discord
 Dollar Shave Club
 Domo
 DoorDash
 Etsy
 Flipkart
 Glassdoor
 Gusto
 HackerOne
 Hortonworks
 Instacart
 Klarna
 MercadoLibre
 New Relic
 Nubank
 Procore
 Redfin
 ResearchGate
 Roblox
 Slack
 Snapchat
 Snowflake
 Spotify
 Strava
 Teabox
 Uber
 UiPath
 Wealthfront
 Whatfix

References

External links
 www.dragoneer.com (Company Website)
 www.dragoneergrowth.com (Capital Markets Platform)

Financial services companies established in 2012
Financial services companies based in California
Companies based in San Francisco
Hedge funds
Venture capital firms